Suzanne Wu Sui-shan (born ) is a Hong Kong politician. She is the former chairwoman of the pro-democratic Labour Party and project coordinator of the Association for the Advancement of Feminism. After leaving Labour in 2017, she co-founded Community March.

Biography
Wu graduated from the St Stephen's College and Hong Kong Polytechnic University with a degree in Language, Culture and Communication. She later went to England with a scholarship and studied at the University of Warwick with a master's degree in Gender and International Development. 

She once led union members to occupy the vice chancellor’s office at the Polytechnic University to call for higher pay for the cleaning staff when she served as a student union leader at the institution. Their pay eventually was raised from some HK$4,500 to HK$6,000. She had been a director at the Hong Kong Confederation of Trade Unions (CTU), focusing on the interests of cleaning workers and security guards, and is also a project coordinator of the Association for the Advancement of Feminism, advocating gender equality. She is also a founding member of the Labour Party. On 13 December 2015, she replaced Lee Cheuk-yan as the chairwoman of the Labour Party after defeating two other candidates with about 60% support. On 23 August 2017, she resigned from the chair and withdrew from the Labour Party. Subsequently she co-founded Community March.

References

External links 

 

1980 births
Living people
Alumni of the Hong Kong Polytechnic University
Alumni of the University of Warwick
Hong Kong Confederation of Trade Unions
Hong Kong social democrats
Hong Kong trade unionists
Hong Kong women in politics